Hypatima tephroptila is a moth in the family Gelechiidae. It was described by Edward Meyrick in 1931. It is found in southern India.

References

Hypatima
Taxa named by Edward Meyrick
Moths described in 1931